Tomas Löfgren (born 1977) is a world champion Swedish ski-orienteering competitor.

Ski orienteering
He competed at the 2004 World Ski Orienteering Championships in Åsarna/Östersund, where he received a gold medal in the middle distance, and a silver medal in the long course behind Eduard Khrennikov. He finished 6th in the sprint, and 4th in the relay event with the Swedish team.

At the World Cup in Ski Orienteering in 2006 Löfgren finished overall second, behind winner Eduard Khrennikov.

References

1977 births
Living people
Swedish orienteers
Male orienteers
Ski-orienteers